7387 Malbil is an elongated background asteroid from the inner regions of the asteroid belt. It was discovered on 30 January 1982, by American astronomer Edward Bowell at Lowell's Anderson Mesa Station in Arizona, United States. It is named for American pianist Malcolm Bilson.

Classification and orbit 

Malbil is a non-family asteroid of the main belt's background population when applying the hierarchical clustering method to its proper orbital elements. It orbits the Sun in the inner main-belt at a distance of 2.1–2.8 AU once every 3 years and 10 months (1,401 days). Its orbit has an eccentricity of 0.15 and an inclination of 7° with respect to the ecliptic. The body's observation arc begins with its first used observation at the discovering observatory in 1986, or 4 years after its official discovery observation.

Naming 

This minor planet was named after American fortepianist and musicologist Malcolm Bilson (born 1935), who gave a recital at the "Asteroids, Comets, Meteors" conference at Cornell University in New York. The approved naming citation was published by the Minor Planet Center on 28 July 1999.

Physical characteristics 

As of 2020, Malbils effective size, its composition and albedo remain unknown. Data from photometric observation gave a modeled sidereal rotation period of 7.5498 hours and two spin axes at (253°, −74°) and (127.0°, −69.0°) in ecliptic coordinates (λ, β). The modeling suggests that the asteroid is rather elongated in shape.

Based on a magnitude-to-diameter conversion, its generic diameter is between 5 and 12 kilometer for an absolute magnitude of 13.4, and an assumed albedo in the range of 0.05 to 0.25. Since asteroids in the inner main-belt are typically of stony rather than carbonaceous composition, with albedos of 0.20 or higher, Malbils diameter can be estimate to measure around 6.3 kilometers, as the higher its albedo (reflectivity), the lower the body's diameter at a constant absolute magnitude (brightness).

References

External links 
 Lightcurve Database Query (LCDB), at www.minorplanet.info
 Dictionary of Minor Planet Names, Google books
 Asteroids and comets rotation curves, CdR – Geneva Observatory, Raoul Behrend
 Discovery Circumstances: Numbered Minor Planets (5001)-(10000) – Minor Planet Center
 
 
 

007387
Discoveries by Edward L. G. Bowell
Named minor planets
19820130